AWOO is the fourth studio album by The Hidden Cameras, released in 2006.

The album was released on EvilEvil in Canada in August. It was released on September 4 on Rough Trade in the UK and was also released on Arts & Crafts in the United States on September 19.

Track listing
 "Death of a Tune" (2:43)
 "AWOO" (2:44)
 "She's Gone" (3:39)
 "Lollipop" (3:13)
 "Fee Fie" (3:27)
 "Learning the Lie" (2:18)
 "Follow These Eyes" (4:22)
 "Heji" (2:37)
 "Heaven Turns To" (3:36)
 "Wandering" (2:46)
 "For Fun" (5:07)
 "Hump From Bending" (3:10)
 "The WAning mOOn" (4:29)

References

2006 albums
The Hidden Cameras albums
Arts & Crafts Productions albums
Rough Trade Records albums